Sakthi is a 2011 Indian Telugu-language fantasy action film directed by Meher Ramesh. The film stars Jr NTR, Ileana D'Cruz, Sonu Sood, Vidyut Jammwal and Jackie Shroff. The film was produced by C. Aswani Dutt through Vyjayanthi Movies, and the music was composed by Mani Sharma.

The follows Sakthi, a tourist guide who accompanies the home minister's daughter Aishwarya and their friends on a journey across various Indian states. Aishwarya has been unwittingly carrying a magical diamond with her, due to which a vengeful Egyptian woman Faqtooni enlists the help of her younger son Bashim and his henchmen. As they try to capture Aishwarya, Sakthi turns out to be her protector and eventually finds himself getting linked to the diamonds and its secrets.

One of the most expensive Telugu-language films, Sakthi was released on 1 April 2011. It opened on more than 700 screens worldwide, mainly receiving negative reviews from critics criticizing the film's screenplay, runtime, execution, action sequences and lack of logic and became a box-office bomb.

Plot

Faqtooni, an Egyptian woman, vows to seek revenge for the death of her husband Mukhtar and trains her sons Bashim and Raakha. She wants to retrieve a magical Jwalamukhi diamond and a Rudra trident. Her brother Jaffer reveals that Mahadevaraya, the Home Minister of India, possesses the diamond. In order to retrieve it, they target his daughter Aishwarya who goes on a secret trip with her friends, after unwittingly packing the diamond in her bag. In Jaipur, they meet Sakthi, a tourist guide who comes to their rescue when goons trouble them. Mahadevaraya learns of Aishwarya's escape from home, and two police officers are assigned to find her. Mahadevaraya requests his former partner Jackie to hand him over the trident in exchange for his entire wealth, but Jackie declines. While in Kashmir, Aishwarya falls for Sakthi after he saves her life. Later, she is kidnapped by Bashim's henchmen but rescued by Sakthi after a fight. Bashim manages to find out they're now heading to Haridwar, where Sakthi comes across the diamond while taking a dip in the Ganges. A sage senses it and informs Mahadevaraya about the cleansing of the diamond and the arrival of Aishwarya's protector. The two cops looking for Aishwarya inform them about her presence in Haridwar. While leaving the city, Aishwarya proposes to Sakthi, but he declines. Soon, Bashim and his henchmen attack them, but Sakthi, revealed to be an undercover agent, protects everyone and captures Bashim after a huge shootout.

Faqtooni tries to retrieve the trident from Jackie, but he demands a huge sum. Aishwarya is questioned about the diamond, but she doesn't know anything. Sakthi explains to officer Siva, his father, that he went undercover to protect Aishwarya as she was the target of a terrorist group. Raakha is sent to India to rescue Bashim. Aishwarya finds pictures of her in Sakthi's bag, which leads to Sakthi confessing that he loved her from the moment he saw her.  Sakthi, along with his parents and Aishwarya, goes to the temple for his birthday and finds the box with the Jwalamukhi and opens it. Siva informs Mahadevaraya and is called to Hampi along with both the diamond and Aishwarya. Raakha attacks the prison and frees Bashim, who, having overheard a conversation, tells him Siva is heading to Hampi. Raakha attacks Siva and other officers but is left wounded by Sakthi, who gains powers after touching the diamond. At Hampi, Bashim tries to snatch the diamond but is killed by Sakthi with an ancient sword. Proclaiming Sakthi as the protector, the sage explains how Rudra who is actually Sakthi's biological father, the protector of a secret Sakthi Peetha, sacrificed his life while protecting his pregnant wife and Mahadevaraya's parents from Mukhtar and his henchmen. Jackie, who was initially known as Janaki Varma, killed Mahadevaraya's parents after being paid by Mukhtar and managed to flee with the Rudra trident. After decapitatating Mukhtar in a fight, the dying Rudra handed over his newborn son (who is now Sakthi) to his loyal servant Basava, who sent him away via the river. He was discovered by Siva and his wife and eventually raised by them.

Sakthi retrieves the trident after killing Jackie's henchmen, Jaffer and Jackie himself. However, Sakthi is betrayed and shot by Mahadevaraya's partner Prachanda, who then acquires the trident and hands it over to Faqtooni as she arrives with a resurrected Raakha. Mahadevaraya stabs Prachanda to death, and Raakha knocks him unconscious. Faqtooni forcibly takes the sage and Aishwarya to perform the compulsory rites conducted every 27 years, and as Raakha begins destruction, Sakthi arrives and fights using the trident. Faqtooni is thrown into a deep pit, while an indestructible Raakha is killed after the sage instructs Sakthi to stab Raakha in his eyes, which were implanted from Mukhtar's severed head. Mahadevaraya regains consciousness, while Sakthi places the trident back and walks out with the diamond in his hand, accompanied by Aishwarya and the sage.

Cast 

 NTR Jr. in a dual role as Sakthi Swaroop and Rudra (Sakthi's biological father)
 Ileana D'Cruz as Aishwarya Mahadevaraya, Sakthi's love interest
 Manjari Phadnis as Gauri, Rudra's wife
 S. P. Balasubrahmanyam as Vijayaraya (Mahadevaraya's father)
 Prabhu as Central Minister Mahadevaraya (Aishwarya's father)
 Jackie Shroff as Janaki Varma / Jackie The Great
 Vinod Kumar as Prachanda
 Pooja Bedi as Faqtooni
 Sonu Sood as Mukthar (Faqtooni's husband)
 Vidyut Jammwal as Wasim Ali (Faqtooni's younger son)
 Daniel Kaleb as Raakha (Faqtooni's elder son) 
 Mukthar Khan as Jaffer (Faqtooni's brother)
 Nassar as Sage
 Ali as Tommy
 Brahmanandam as Avatar
 Krishna Bhagavaan as Devudu / David
 Sayaji Shinde as Sivaji/Sivaraj as Sakthi's adopted father
 Pragathi as Siva's wife
 Dharmavarapu Subramanyam as Subba Rao
 Venu Madhav as Satti Babu
 M. S. Narayana as Haridwar priest
 Manju Bhargavi as Mahadevaraya's mother
 Chatrapathi Sekhar as Basava (Rudra's servant)

Release
Sakthi was released on 1 April 2011 with the Tamil dubbed version titled Om Sakthi releasing on 2 April 2011. The film was also dubbed and released in Hindi as Shakti: Ek Tha Soldier in 2012 and in Bhojpuri as Hamaar Shoorveer.

Reception

Shakti mainly received negative reviews from critics. 123Telugu.com gave the film 1 stars out of 5, appreciating the storyplot, music and Egyptian episodes. Radhika Rajamani from Rediff.com gave the film 2 stars out of 5, appreciating the Egyptian connection and the second half. The Times of India gave the film 2 stars out of 5 and praised the cinematography, performance, music, storyplot and visualisation, but criticized the action sequences, screenplay and logic mistakes.

Box office

The collections saw a rise in the second week as the film collected a total of INR 15.64 crore in Andhra Pradesh. By the end of its theatrical run, the film collected a total of INR 19.01 crore worldwide.

The film was dubbed into Tamil, titled as Om Sakthi. Howerver, the film was a commercial failure at the box office.

Soundtrack

The soundtrack, composed by Mani Sharma, was released on 27 February 2011.

References

External links
 

2011 films
2010s Telugu-language films
2010s fantasy action films
Indian fantasy action films
Films scored by Mani Sharma
Films directed by Meher Ramesh
Films set in Egypt
Films shot in Egypt
Films shot in Karnataka
Films shot in Manali, Himachal Pradesh
Films shot in the United Arab Emirates
Films shot in Dubai
Films shot in Rajasthan
Films shot in Jaipur
Films shot in Ladakh